Central Airlines was a scheduled passenger airline (the Civil Aeronautics Board (CAB) called it a "local service" air carrier) operating service in Arkansas, Colorado, Kansas, Missouri, Oklahoma, and Texas from 1949 to 1967. It was founded by Keith Kahle in 1944 to operate charter and fixed base services in Oklahoma, but was not granted an air operator's certificate until 1946 and did not begin scheduled flights until , just before the certificate expired.  Central was then headquartered at Meacham Field in Fort Worth, Texas. The airline was eventually acquired by and merged into the original Frontier Airlines which continued and expanded its network.

History
Early backers and members of the board of directors included Fort Worth oilman F. Kirk Johnson, former City Councilman R.E. Harding, Jr., Don Earhart, and actor James Stewart; Stewart remained on the board for many years. Lamar Muse was president before going to Universal Airlines, Southwest Airlines, and then founding Muse Air.

On , the CAB awarded Central Airlines an operating certificate for commercial service in Oklahoma and Texas. Despite this, flights still had not started in March 1949, and the CAB gave the airline until July 1 of that year to start service or lose its certificate. On 10 August, Kahle announced that Central had purchased eight Beechcraft Bonanzas, and that service would start soon. The airline's inaugural flight finally occurred on 15 September 1949 from Fort Worth to Oklahoma City with intermediate stops in Dallas and Gainesville. By the end of its first year of service, Central had carried 8,122 passengers.

In November 1950, Central began operating three Douglas DC-3s, and announced that its fleet of eleven Bonanzas would be phased out as more DC-3s were acquired. Convair CV-240s were added in the 1960s; beginning in 1965 the CV-240s were converted to Convair CV-600s, their piston engines being replaced with Rolls-Royce Dart turboprop engines.

In August 1953 Central scheduled flights to 19 airports. Central's 1955 network blanketed Oklahoma and extended to Amarillo, Dallas-Fort Worth, Little Rock and Kansas City; in April 1957 it served 29 airports. When the airline merged into Frontier in October 1967, Central routes served 40 cities from Denver, Colorado to Kansas City and St. Louis, Missouri  and south to Oklahoma City, Tulsa, Dallas and Fort Worth.

In 1961 the head office moved to Amon Carter Field (later renamed Greater Southwest International Airport) in Fort Worth. That same year, Central carried its millionth passenger; in 1962, Central was operating six Convairs and eighteen DC-3s, and carrying about 24,000 passengers a month.

Like other "local service" airlines regulated by the federal CAB, Central was subsidized; in 1963, its operating revenues of  million (equivalent to  million in ) included a  million federal subsidy (equivalent to  million in ).

On 20 September 1966, Central filed a petition with the CAB to merge with Ozark Air Lines, which would have created one of the largest local service carriers in the United States. Central cited financial difficulties as the reason for seeking a merger. The merged company would use the Ozark name. However, on 9 November 1966, the two airlines announced that merger talks had ended by mutual consent due to financial difficulties.

When it was acquired by and merged into the original Frontier Airlines on October 1, 1967, Central was operating a fleet of  Convair CV-600 turboprops as well as sixteen Douglas piston-powered DC-3s. Central was planning to introduce new Douglas DC-9-10 jets with the airline running a print ad in the Official Airline Guide announcing this upcoming DC-9 service; however, the DC-9s were never delivered due to the merger. Frontier continued to operate the Convair CV-600s for a time but then retired them in favor of Convair CV-580 turboprops which were the backbone of Frontier's fleet in the late 1960s. Frontier would eventually introduce Boeing 737-200 jet service to smaller cities previously served by Central including Fort Smith, AR; Joplin, MO; Lawton, OK; Manhattan, KS; Pueblo, CO; Salina, KS; and Topeka, KS. In 1986 Frontier Airlines (1950-1986) was merged into Continental Airlines. In 2010 Continental was merged into United Airlines.

Central Airlines received four consecutive National Safety Council aviation safety awards from 1950 to 1953 for operating without a single accident or injury to passengers or crew. National Transportation Safety Board (NTSB) records indicate that no passenger was ever seriously injured or killed aboard a Central Airlines flight from 1962 to 1968.

Destinations
On inauguration of service in late 1949 and early 1950, Central served the following destinations:

 Ada, OK
 Amarillo, TX
 Ardmore, OK
 Arkansas City, KS
 Bartlesville, OK
 Dallas, TX - Dallas Love Field
 Durant, OK
 Enid, OK
 Fort Worth, TX - Meacham Field
 Gainesville, TX
 Greenville, TX
 Holdenville, OK
 Oklahoma City, OK
 Okmulgee, OK
 Pampa, TX
 Paris, TX
 Ponca City, OK
 Shawnee, OK
 Sherman, TX - Sherman Municipal Airport
 Texarkana, AR/TX
 Tulsa, OK
 Wichita, KS
 Woodward, OK

According to its July 1, 1967 timetable, Central was serving the following destinations shortly before the merger with Frontier:

 Ada, OK
 Amarillo, TX
 Bartlesville, OK
 Borger, TX
 Colorado Springs, CO
 Dallas, TX - Dallas Love Field (DAL)
 Denver, CO
 Dodge City, KS
 Duncan, OK
 Enid, OK
 Fayetteville, AR
 Fort Leonard Wood, MO
 Fort Smith, AR
 Fort Worth, TX - Greater Southwest International Airport (GSW) - no longer in existence
 Garden City, KS
 Goodland, KS
 Great Bend, KS
 Guymon, OK
 Harrison, AR
 Hays, KS
 Hot Springs, AR
 Hutchinson, KS
 Joplin, MO
 Kansas City - Kansas City Municipal Airport (MKC)
 Lamar, CO
 Lawton, OK
 Liberal, KS
 Little Rock, AR
 Manhattan, KS
 McAlester, OK
 Muskogee, OK
 Paris, TX
 Parsons, KS
 Ponca City, OK
 Pueblo, CO
 St. Louis, MO
 Salina, KS
 Stillwater, OK
 Topeka, KS
 Tulsa, OK
 Wichita Falls, TX

The timetable states that Central was operating Convair 600s and Douglas DC-3s at this time.

Fleet

Central Airlines operated the following:

 Beechcraft Bonanza (model A35)
 Convair 240
 Convair 600 (Convair 240 converted to Rolls-Royce Dart turboprop engines)
 Douglas DC-3

The airline announced it was planning to operate Douglas DC-9-10 jets, but none were delivered before the merger with Frontier.

Accidents and incidents
 20 July 1964: A flight attendant on a scheduled passenger flight suffered serious injuries when she was thrown against the cabin structure in a Douglas DC-3, registration number N91003, due to clear-air turbulence over Pueblo, Colorado. Eleven passengers and two pilots suffered minor or no injuries and the aircraft was not damaged.
 8 January 1965: The pilots of Flight 168 to Topeka, Kansas, a Convair CV-240, registration number N74850, diverted to Tulsa International Airport and performed an intentional belly landing after several unsuccessful attempts to lower the jammed landing gear. The aircraft was substantially damaged but the nine passengers and three crew were not significantly injured.
 27 June 1966: Pilots in a Convair CV-600, registration number N74856, had to perform evasive maneuvers near Hot Springs, Arkansas to avoid a mid-air collision with an unidentified light aircraft. One crew member suffered serious injuries while two crew and fourteen passengers suffered minor or no injuries; the Convair was not damaged.

See also 
 List of defunct airlines of the United States

References

External links 

 Central Airlines website
 Central Airlines Collection website
 Central Airlines photographs
 A large collection of Central Airlines memorabilia
 Old Frontier Airlines a website about the history of the old Frontier Airlines and its predecessor airlines.
 Encyclopedia of Oklahoma History and Culture - Central Airlines

Defunct airlines of the United States
Airlines established in 1949
Airlines disestablished in 1967
Companies based in Fort Worth, Texas
Defunct companies based in Texas
American companies established in 1949
Airlines based in Texas